III Wishes is the third album by the group Shooting Star. This is the band's first album without keyboardist Bill Guffey, who had departed from the band the previous year.

Track listing

Personnel
Gary West – lead and backing vocals, keyboards, guitars
Charles Waltz – violin, keyboards, backing and lead vocals
Van McLain – lead guitar, lead and backing vocals
Steve Thomas – drums
Ron Verlin – bass

References

1982 albums
Shooting Star (band) albums
Albums produced by Kevin Elson